Pina is a feminine given name and a Portuguese and Spanish surname. Notable people with the name include:

Given name or nickname 
 Pina Bausch (1940–2009), German choreographer
 Pina Carmirelli (1914–1993), Italian violinist
 Pina Gallini (1888–1974), Italian actress
 Pina Kollars, 21st century Austrian singer
 Pina Manique (1733–1805), Portuguese magistrate
 Pina Piovani (1897–1955), Italian stage and film actress
 Pina Renzi (1901–1984), Italian actress

Stage name
 Pina Menichelli (1890–1984), Italian actress Giuseppa Iolanda Menichelli 
 Pina Pellicer (1934–1964), Mexican actress Josefina Yolanda Pellicer López de Llergo

Surname 
 Daniel Bautista Pina (born 1981), Spanish football player
 João Pina (born 1981), Portuguese judoka
 Kevin Pina (footballer) (born 1997), Cape Verdean footballer
 Kevin Pina (journalist), American journalist
 Larry Pina (born 1947), American non-fiction writer
 Rui de Pina (1440–1521), Portuguese chronicler

See also 
 João de Pina-Cabral (born 1954), a Portuguese anthropologist
 Maria do Céu Sarmento Pina da Costa, East Timorese politician

Lists of people by surname
Lists of people by given name
Italian feminine given names
Spanish-language surnames
Portuguese-language surnames